Papurana milleti (Millet's frog or Dalat frog) is a species of true frog.  Originally described in the genus Rana, then Hylarana and Indosylvirana, it is now placed in Papurana.  It is native to Cambodia, China (Yunnan), Thailand, Vietnam, and quite possibly Laos. It is a locally common frog found by ponds and streams in seasonal tropical forests.

References

Amphibians of Cambodia
Amphibians of China
Amphibians of Thailand
Amphibians of Vietnam
Amphibians described in 1921
milleti